The 1897–98 Sheffield Shield season was the sixth season of the Sheffield Shield, the domestic first-class cricket competition of Australia. Victoria won the championship.

Table

Statistics

Most Runs
Clem Hill 367

Most Wickets
Ernie Jones 33

References

Sheffield Shield
Sheffield Shield
Sheffield Shield seasons